Competitor for  Canada

Myrtle Alice Cook (also competed as Myrtle McGowan) (January 5, 1902 – March 18, 1985) was a Canadian athlete who competed mainly in the 100 metres.

Career
Born in Toronto, Ontario, she competed for Canada at the 1928 Summer Olympics held in Amsterdam, Netherlands where she won the gold medal in the women's 4 x 100 metres with her team mates 100 m silver medallist Fanny Rosenfeld, 100 m bronze medallist Ethel Smith and Jane Bell.

Cook was involved in ice hockey and served as president of the Dominion Women's Amateur Hockey Association prior to 1937.

Cook equalled Betty Robinson's Women's 100m World Record on August 1, 1931. She died in Elora, Ontario in 1985.

References

External links
 Library and Archives Canada: Myrtle Cook

1902 births
1985 deaths
Canadian female sprinters
Athletes (track and field) at the 1928 Summer Olympics
Canadian people of British descent
World record setters in athletics (track and field)
Olympic track and field athletes of Canada
Olympic gold medalists for Canada
People from Old Toronto
Medalists at the 1928 Summer Olympics
Athletes from Toronto
Olympic gold medalists in athletics (track and field)
Olympic female sprinters